Gamnip-cha or persimmon leaf tea is a traditional Korean tea made from the dried leaves of Oriental persimmon.

Preparation 
Young leaves are picked in May or June, washed, and dried for two to three days in shade. Dried leaves are usually cut into small pieces and steamed, and dried again. A drop of maesil-ju (plum liquor) or yuja-cheong (yuja marmalade) can be added to the tea when served.

Gallery

References 

Herbal tea
Korean tea
Leaf tea